Mehdi Saki (born 1974, Khuzekstan) is an Iranian actor, composer, and singer.

Filmography

Actor

Composer 

 2016: Iran im Herzen

Discography 

 2015: Kamakan

References

External links 

1974 births
Living people